Ronald or Ron Ellis may refer to:

Ronald L. Ellis (born 1950), New York Magistrate Judge
Ronald W. Ellis (born 1960), American racehorse trainer
Ronald Ellis (politician) (born 1952), member of the Kansas House of Representatives
Ron Ellis (born 1945), retired Canadian professional ice hockey player
Ron Ellis (basketball) (born 1968), American/Belgian basketball player
Ron Ellis (filmmaker), filmmaker known for his work dealing with mental retardation
Ron Ellis (author) (born 1941), British crime novelist, broadcaster and journalist
Ron Ellis (footballer) (1915–2008), Australian rules footballer